The Virgin MVR-02 is a Formula One racing car designed by Wirth Research for Marussia Virgin Racing, and used by them during the 2011 Formula One season. Like its predecessor, the Virgin VR-01, the MVR-02 was designed entirely with computational fluid dynamics, with Nick Wirth's design studio doubling their CFD capacity ahead of the 2011 season. The addition of the "M" in the car's chassis designation reflected the team's new owner, Russian sports car manufacturer Marussia Motors. The car was unveiled in London on 7 February 2011, and was driven during the racing season by returning driver Timo Glock and debutant Jérôme d'Ambrosio.

Design
The MVR-02 followed the VR-01's design principle of exclusively using computational fluid dynamics instead of the more traditional windtunnel approach. The car did not use KERS; chief designer Nick Wirth commented that the gains offered by the system did not justify the expense of developing it. Instead, the team concentrated on improving the car's hydraulics and gearbox, both of which had been the frequent source of problems in 2010. After being forced to re-design the VR-01 when it was discovered the fuel tank was not large enough to finish races with high fuel consumption, the MVR-02 was designed to be the same length as the original VR-01 chassis whilst retaining the full-size fuel tank. The air intake on the front of the nose was designed to resemble the one on Marussia's road car, the Marussia B2.

In June 2011 that Marussia Virgin Racing announced that they had ended their relationship with technical partner Nick Wirth and his company, Wirth Research, who designed their 2010 and 2011 cars. The reason cited was a disappointing start to their 2011 season.

Racing history 
The MVR-02 entered its first race at the 2011 Australian Grand Prix. The car was performing poorly due to the condition of the track and speculation rose up that Virgin was not going to be able to race. However, both Timo Glock and Jérôme d'Ambrosio made it through qualifying, taking the penultimate row on the grid. Once the race went underway Glock was forced to make a lengthy stop in the garage, due to a mechanical failure. As a result, Glock completed less than 90% of the race distance and although the car was running at the end of the race he was not classified in the standings. D'Ambrosio finished sixteenth on the track, but the disqualification of both Sauber cars bumped him up to fourteenth.

At the 2011 Malaysian Grand Prix d'Ambrosio suffered from a mechanical failure during free practice. Qualifying was a repeat of Australia, with the drivers taking twenty-first and twenty-second. In the race d'Ambrosio retired due to electronic problems. Glock finished sixteenth, his first classified finish of the season. With only one retirement at the 2011 Chinese Grand Prix, both drivers finished just one place higher than their qualifying positions, in 20th and 21st places.

For the 2011 Turkish Grand Prix the team applied their first upgrade to the car. Glock was given an "extreme" update, while d'Ambrosio had to wait until the 2011 Spanish Grand Prix. Despite this, d'Ambrosio was faster than Glock for the whole weekend. The stewards awarded him a five-place grid penalty after ignoring yellow flags on Friday, due to which his starting place was twenty-third, while Glock's was twenty-first. When it came time for the cars to take their positions on the grid Glock's pit crew noticed a mechanical fault and set to correct it. However, the repair proved so drawn out that Glock ended up not racing. D'Ambrosio suffered from no problems and drove the car home to twentieth place.

During the 2011 Spanish Grand Prix both cars had been upgraded and finish nineteenth and twentieth, with both drivers not complaining of any faults. At the 2011 Monaco Grand Prix the MVR-02 once again took the eleventh row on the grid. In the race, Glock suffered a suspension failure on lap 30. After the dramatic and unprecedented end of the race, d'Ambrosio finished fifteenth, bringing the MVR-02 to another classified finish.

At the 2011 Canadian Grand Prix the MVR-02s showed enough pace to finish fourteenth and fifteenth. At the following race, the 2011 European Grand Prix, the Marussia Virgin team complained that diffuser rules appeared to have hampered their chances of being competitive. Glock and d'Ambrosio qualified 21st and 23rd for the race. Then came the British Grand Prix, which was the first race with full diffuser bans. The track conditions were in between dry and damp, conditions that had hampered the team in Australia. Glock finished in sixteenth and d'Ambrosio was seventeenth.

In Germany the two cars qualified twentieth and twenty-second on the grid, with Glock ahead of d'Ambrosio. Glock commented to his engineers on the car-to-pit radio that they were making it "difficult for him" after this. Glock later tried to cover up his comments by saying they were meant in a joking way. Glock announced the following day that he would be staying with the team until 2014. The two cars finished the race in the same order, but in seventeenth and eighteenth places. The MVR-02s sandwiched the HRTs in Hungary, having qualified in twenty-first and last places. Glock finished the race of mixed weather conditions seventeenth and his teammate d'Ambrosio was nineteenth.

The car was not expected to do well in the power circuit of Spa. The cars were twentieth and twenty-first, with d'Ambrosio outside the 107% rule for his home race. He was allowed to race, however, because it had been a mixed weather qualifying. With no such weather in the race, he brought the car home in seventeenth, one place above Glock. Qualifying on the second back row, d'Ambrosio suffered a gearbox failure on lap 1, and although Glock managed one of the team's best results of the year with a fifteenth-place finish, this was last place. It was the same Q1 result in Singapore, although Glock crashed out on lap nine whilst d'Ambrosio finished eighteenth. The Virgin cars took positions 20 and 21 in both qualifying and the race in Japan. They beat the HRTs and Nico Rosberg's Mercedes, which had suffered hydraulics failure, in Qualifying, before again beating the HRTs and benefiting from the retirement of Sébastien Buemi in the race.

At the first-ever , the cars set the two slowest times in qualifying, with D'Ambrosio the faster of the two teammates inside the 107% rule time, and Glock nearly two seconds outside of it. Glock was allowed to start the race because he set competitive times in practice. The two HRT cars were given penalties, so the cars started on the penultimate row instead. The race was short-lived for Glock, who retired after just two laps after being run into by the Sauber of Kobayashi. D'Ambrosio finished sixteenth, ahead of the two HRTs and Jarno Trulli. In Abu Dhabi, Glock qualified twentieth and finished nineteenth whilst D'Ambrosio qualified two places lower and retired from the race with brake problems.

The season finale - the  - was the team's final race as Virgin. D'Ambrosio qualified ahead of Glock, but the pair were on the last row of the grid. Glock became the first retirement of the race, whilst D'Ambrosio finished nineteenth, ahead of the two HRTs.

Complete Formula One results
(key) (results in bold indicate pole position; results in italics indicate fastest lap)

References

External links

MVR-02
Marussia Motors